Florina "Flo" Kaja (born September 1, 1982) is an American reality television personality, singer and actress native to Staten Island, New York. She is mostly known by her stage name "Flo". Kaja was a participant on season 4 of Oxygen's Bad Girls Club. During the show, she became an LGBT rights activist.

At the time of its airing, Kaja's episode Go With The Flo became one of the most watched episode of the Bad Girls Club, achieving 2.27 million viewers. Kaja has appeared on The Tyra Banks Show and her television special Bad Girls Club: Flo Gets Married aired on Oxygen on February 28, 2011. Kaja was a contestant on Bad Girls All-Star Battle and the runner-up of Season 1.

Kaja is "the first Albanian Muslim woman ever to be on a reality TV show". She is the third bisexual that has appeared on The Bad Girls Club after Sarah "Cordelia" Carlisle and Ty Colliers. She is also a strong believer of Allah.

Early life 
Kaja was born on September 1, 1982 in Staten Island, New York as the second child and younger daughter of Albanian immigrant couple Sakip Kaja (1953–1990) and Safija (pronounced 'Sophia'). Kaja's father's brother, Verdi Kaja, who was shot three times by accused killer Carmine Carini, was an Albanian gangster and was found dead when Kaja was 8 years old. Kaja attended Curtis High School up until her sophomore year and graduated from New Dorp High School in 2000.

Bad Girls Club 

Kaja was a participant on the fourth season of the Bad Girls Club which aired from December 2, 2009 to March 31, 2010 on Oxygen in the United States. Kaja was nicknamed "Flo" prior to her season of the Bad Girls Club by her friends and family. Kaja first starred in Season 4, in episode one, "Off The Wall" and came out to her roommates as a bisexual. Kaja then became the third "bad girl" to ever be openly bisexual. Kaja was then injured after an altercation with Amber McWha during the seventh episode, but she later recovered before she voluntarily left the show during the tenth episode. Kaja stated, upon exiting, that she felt that the other roommates did not care about her or respect her life. During the reunion, Kaja  stated that she left so she would not physically harm anyone.

After The Bad Girls Club, Kaja continued to appear in interviews. Kaja also appeared in the Bad Girls Club special entitled Top 10 OMG's in Bad Girls Club History which aired a week after the part two reunion show of the fifth season had aired.

Television special, marriage and pregnancy 
Bad Girls Club: Flo Gets Married was a 2 episode special that centered on Kaja's traditional Albanian wedding to Patriot "Pat Coso" Kosovrasti and her pregnancy. It aired on Oxygen on February 28, 2011.

Kaja met Kosovrasti at a Staten Island club and instantly became inseparable, after finding out they were both Albanian-Americans. Within months the two decided to get married. Kosovrasti's mother Angie, sought out Kaja as the antithesis of a traditional Albanian house wife and disapproved of her "bad ways" stating that Kaja was not the daughter-in-law that she had wanted. The entire event leading up to Kaja's marriage was taped and broadcast on Oxygen. The television special garnered 0.85 million viewers, outperforming season one and some episodes of season two. While preparing to get married, Kaja and Kosovrasti found out that she was pregnant. Kaja gave birth to her first child, a girl named Elliana Kosovrasti, on July 1, 2011. The couple split soon after the child’s birth. Patriot “Pat Coso” Kosovrasti remarried, his now wife Krystal Kosovrasti in October 2020. The two of them have been together since he and Kaja parted. She remains single and working as a medium with a following of over 50,000 people on Instagram and over 6,000 on her YouTube channel where she offers tarot card readings.

Bad Girls All-Star Battle 

In 2013, Kaja was selected as one of 14 past Bad Girls Club cast members to compete in the first season of Bad Girls All-Star Battle, a challenge show where all-stars compete for $100,000. She made it to the final episode of the season, where she ended up first runner-up to Jenniffer Hardwick.

Filmography

Discography

Singles 
 Tear It Up (2010) (feat. KofI Black)
 Wanda's Way (2010)
 Alpha Females (2011) (feat. Maya Greene)

See also 

List of bisexual people (G–M)

Notes

External links 
 

1982 births
American Muslims
American people of Albanian descent
Bisexual actresses
Bisexual musicians
American LGBT musicians
LGBT Muslims
American LGBT rights activists
Living people
People from Staten Island
Singers from New York City
Participants in American reality television series
Activists from New York (state)
21st-century American singers
21st-century American women singers
New Dorp High School alumni